The International Tree-Ring Data Bank (ITRDB) is a data repository for tree ring measurements that has been maintained since 1990 by the United States' National Oceanic and Atmospheric Administration Paleoclimatology Program and World Data Center for Paleoclimatology. The ITRDB was initially established by Hal Fritts through the Laboratory of Tree-Ring Research at the University of Arizona through a grant from the US National Science Foundation after the First International Workshop on Dendrochronology in 1974. The ITRDB accepts all tree ring data with sufficient metadata to be uploaded, but was founded with a focus on tree ring measurements intended for climatic studies. Specific information is required for uploading data to the data base, such as the raw tree ring measurements, an indication of the type of measurement (full ring widths, earlywood, latewood), and the location, but the types of data and the rules for accuracy and precision of the primary data, tree-ring width measurements, are decided by the dendrochronologists who are contributing the data rather than by the NOAA or another governing organization.

See also 

 Dendrochronology

References

External links
 International Tree-Ring Data Bank
   Ultimate Tree-Ring Web Pages 
 Laboratory of Tree-Ring Research University of Arizona

Archaeological databases
Dating methodologies in archaeology
Incremental dating
Scientific databases
Geochronological institutions and organizations
Dendrology